The climate of Rajasthan in northwestern India is generally arid or semi-arid and features fairly hot temperatures over the year with extreme temperatures in both summer and winter.

History

Under the Köppen climate classification the greater part of Rajasthan falls under Hot Desert (BWh) and remaining portions of the state falls under Hot Semi Arid (BSh); the climate of the state ranges from arid to semi-arid. Rajasthan receives low and variable rainfalls and thereby is prone to droughts. As Rajasthan is the dry and hot state, Unbelievable hailstorm covered Nagaur, Rajasthan in a thin snow-like icy blanket in December 2019. Later on, it is clarified that this is not a snowfall but a hailstorm, endorse by western disturbances. The climate has changed in winters like never before.

Seasons

Summer
Due to the Desert Geography,  frequently climb above 40 to 45 degrees Celsius in most places.

Due to its location, summers are the longest season in Rajasthan.

In this time tourist activities are very low.

Winter
The cold weather commences early in October and ends around the end of February and sometimes the temperatures reach nearly 2-degree celsius [*record in 1964 in JAIPUR the temperature reached 0-degree Celsius on 13 December.]

.

Monsoon
The state has two distinct periods of rainfall: rainfall due to the South-West Monsoon after summer and rainfall due to Western Disturbances.

Temperature

Precipitation

Disasters

Drought and famine
Rajasthan receives low and variable rainfalls and thereby is prone to droughts. Availability of water is less due to the absence of rivers and lakes.

Floods
Occasional floods in cities due to improper drainage occurs. Sometimes floods also occur in western Rajasthan due to impervious base rocks.

Pollution
In some industrial and urban centers pollution has been reported occasionally.

Climate data

See also
 Climate of India
 Loo
 Thar Desert

References

Climate of India
Environment of Rajasthan
Geography of Rajasthan